The 1968 VFL Golden Fleece Night Premiership was the Victorian Football League end of season cup competition played in September and October of the 1968 VFL Premiership Season. Run as a knock-out tournament, it was contested by the eight VFL teams that failed to make the 1968 VFL finals series. It was the 13th VFL Night Series competition. Games were played at the Lake Oval, Albert Park, then the home ground of South Melbourne, as it was the only ground equipped to host night games. Hawthorn won its first night series cup defeating North Melbourne in the final by 61 points.

Games

Round 1

|- bgcolor="#CCCCFF"
| Winning team
| Winning team score
| Losing team
| Losing team score
| Ground
| Crowd
| Date
|- bgcolor="#FFFFFF"
| 
| 16.10 (106)
| 
| 10.22 (82)
| Lake Oval
| 14,285
| Thursday, 5 September
|- bgcolor="#FFFFFF"
| 
| 11.14 (80)
| 
| 11.9 (75)
| Lake Oval
| 12,059
| Tuesday, 10 September
|- bgcolor="#FFFFFF"
| 
| 18.19 (127)
| 
| 18.7 (115)
| Lake Oval
| 10,020
| Thursday, 12 September
|- bgcolor="#FFFFFF"
| 
| 15.15 (105)
| 
| 16.8 (104)
| Lake Oval
| 15,037
| Tuesday, 17 September

Semi-finals

|- bgcolor="#CCCCFF"
| Winning team
| Winning team score
| Losing team
| Losing team score
| Ground
| Crowd
| Date
|- bgcolor="#FFFFFF"
| 
| 19.14 (128)
| 
| 14.10 (94)
| Lake Oval
| 15,336
| Thursday, 19 September
|- bgcolor="#FFFFFF"
| 
| 18.11 (119)
| 
| 12.17 (89)
| Lake Oval
| 7,052
| Tuesday, 24 September

Final

|- bgcolor="#CCCCFF"
| Winning team
| Winning team score
| Losing team
| Losing team score
| Ground
| Crowd
| Date
|- bgcolor="#FFFFFF"
| 
| 16.15 (111)
| 
| 6.14 (50)
| Lake Oval
| 15,650
| Wednesday, 2 October

See also

List of Australian Football League night premiers
1968 VFL season

References

External links
 1968 VFL Night Premiership - detailed review including quarter-by-quarter scores, best players and goalkickers for each match

Australian Football League pre-season competition